Khodaabad may refer to:
 Khodaabad, Fars
 Khodaabad, Kerman
 Khodaabad, Razavi Khorasan
 Khodaabad, Sistan and Baluchestan
 Khodaabad-e Bala, Yazd Province
 Khodaabad-e Pain, Yazd Province